Cytochrome c oxidase subunit III (COX3) is an enzyme that in humans is encoded by the MT-CO3 gene. It is one of main transmembrane subunits of cytochrome c oxidase. It is also one of the three mitochondrial DNA (mtDNA) encoded subunits (MT-CO1, MT-CO2, MT-CO3) of respiratory complex IV. Variants of it have been associated with isolated myopathy, severe encephalomyopathy, Leber hereditary optic neuropathy, mitochondrial complex IV deficiency, and recurrent myoglobinuria .

Structure 
The MT-CO3 gene produces a 30 kDa protein composed of 261 amino acids. COX3, the protein encoded by this gene, is a member of the cytochrome c oxidase subunit 3 family. This protein is located on the inner mitochondrial membrane. COX3 is a multi-pass transmembrane protein: in human, it contains 7 transmembrane domains at positions 15–35, 42–59, 81–101, 127–147, 159–179, 197–217, and 239–259.

Function 
Cytochrome c oxidase is the terminal enzyme of the respiratory chain of mitochondria and many aerobic bacteria. It catalyzes the transfer of electrons from reduced cytochrome c to molecular oxygen:

 4 cytochrome c+2 + 4 H+ + O2  4 cytochrome c+3 + 2 H2O

This reaction is coupled to the pumping of four additional protons across the mitochondrial or bacterial membrane.

Cytochrome c oxidase is an oligomeric enzymatic complex that is located in the mitochondrial inner membrane of eukaryotes and in the plasma membrane of aerobic prokaryotes. The core structure of prokaryotic and eukaryotic cytochrome c oxidase contains three common subunits, I, II and III. In prokaryotes, subunits I and III can be fused and a fourth subunit is sometimes found, whereas in eukaryotes there are a variable number of additional small subunits.

As the bacterial respiratory systems are branched, they have a number of distinct terminal oxidases, rather than the single cytochrome c oxidase present in the eukaryotic mitochondrial systems. Although the cytochrome o oxidases do not catalyze the cytochrome c but the quinol (ubiquinol) oxidation they belong to the same haem-copper oxidase superfamily as cytochrome c oxidases. Members of this family share sequence similarities in all three core subunits: subunit I is the most conserved subunit, whereas subunit II is the least conserved.

Clinical significance
Mutations in mtDNA-encoded cytochrome c oxidase subunit genes have been observed to be associated with isolated myopathy, severe encephalomyopathy, Leber hereditary optic neuropathy, mitochondrial complex IV deficiency, and recurrent myoglobinuria .

Leber hereditary optic neuropathy (LHON) 

LHON is a maternally inherited disease resulting in acute or subacute loss of central vision, due to optic nerve dysfunction. Cardiac conduction defects and neurological defects have also been described in some patients. LHON results from primary mitochondrial DNA mutations affecting the respiratory chain complexes. Mutations at positions 9438 and 9804, which result in glycine-78 to serine and alanine-200 to threonine amino acid changes, have been associated with this disease.

Mitochondrial complex IV deficiency (MT-C4D) 

Complex IV deficiency (COX deficiency) is a disorder of the mitochondrial respiratory chain with heterogeneous clinical manifestations, ranging from isolated myopathy to severe multisystem disease affecting several tissues and organs. Features include hypertrophic cardiomyopathy, hepatomegaly and liver dysfunction, hypotonia, muscle weakness, exercise intolerance, developmental delay, delayed motor development, mental retardation, lactic acidemia, encephalopathy, ataxia, and cardiac arrhythmia. Some affected individuals manifest a fatal hypertrophic cardiomyopathy resulting in neonatal death and a subset of patients manifest Leigh syndrome. The mutations G7970T and G9952A have been associated with this disease.

Recurrent myoglobinuria mitochondrial (RM-MT) 

Recurrent myoglobinuria is characterized by recurrent attacks of rhabdomyolysis (necrosis or disintegration of skeletal muscle) associated with muscle pain and weakness, and followed by excretion of myoglobin in the urine. It has been associated with mitochondrial complex IV deficiency.

Subfamilies 
 Cytochrome o ubiquinol oxidase, subunit III 
 Cytochrome aa3 quinol oxidase, subunit III

Interactions 
COX3 has been shown to have 15 binary protein-protein interactions including 8 co-complex interactions. COX3 appears to interact with SNCA, KRAS, RAC1, and HSPB2.

References

Further reading

External links 
  GeneReviews/NCBI/NIH/UW entry on Mitochondrial DNA-Associated Leigh Syndrome and NARP

Protein domains
Protein families
Transmembrane proteins
Human mitochondrial genes